Jan Uuspõld läheb Tartusse (English release title: 186 Kilometres) is a 2007 Estonian comedy film directed by Andres Maimik and Rain Tolk.

Plot

Cast

Release
Participation in film festivals:
 2007: goEast - Festival of Central and Eastern European Film (Wiesbaden, Germany), competition program
 2007: Warsaw International Film Festival (Poland)
 2007: Kinoshock - Open Film Festival for states of the CIS and Estonia, Latvia and Lithuania (Anapa, Russia)
 2007: Vancouver Film Festival (Canada), 2007
 2008: Mumbai Film Festival (India)

References

External links
 
 Jan Uuspõld läheb Tartusse, entry in Estonian Film Database (EFIS)

2007 films
Estonian comedy films
Estonian-language films